The Nicaraguan woodrat (Neotoma chrysomelas) is a species of rodent in the family Cricetidae found in Honduras and Nicaragua.

References

Musser, G. G. and M. D. Carleton. 2005. Superfamily Muroidea. pp. 894–1531 in Mammal Species of the World a Taxonomic and Geographic Reference. D. E. Wilson and D. M. Reeder eds. Johns Hopkins University Press, Baltimore.

Neotoma
Mammals described in 1908
Taxonomy articles created by Polbot